Bruche may refer to:
Bruche (river), a river in Alsace, France.
Bruche, Warrington, a suburb of Warrington, United Kingdom.
Bruche Police National Training Centre, a former police training centre located there.